Ekaterini or Aikaterini (Greek:) is a Greek feminine given name. It is an original Greek form of Katherine. Notable people with the name include:

 Princess Katherine of Greece and Denmark (1913-2007), originally Αικατερίνη, was the third daughter and youngest child of King Constantine I of Greece and Sophia of Prussia and Sister of King Paul of the Hellenes 
 Katherine, Crown Princess of Yugoslavia, originally Αικατερίνη, is the wife of Alexander, Crown Prince of Yugoslavia
 Ekaterini Koffa (born 1969), Greek sprinter
 Katerina Nikolaidou (born 1992), Greek rower
 Ekaterini Pavlidou (born 1993), Greek chess player
 Katerina Stefanidi (born 1990), Greek pole vaulter
 Ekaterini Thanou (born 1975), Greek sprinter
 Ekaterini Voggoli (born 1970), Greek discus thrower

References

Greek feminine given names